Sulphur Bluff Independent School District is a public school district based in the community of Sulphur Bluff, Texas (USA).

Located in northeastern Hopkins County, the district extends into a small portion of Franklin County.

Sulphur Bluff ISD has one school that serves students in grades Pre-Kindergarten though twelve.

In 2009, the school district was rated "academically acceptable" by the Texas Education Agency.

The district changed to a four day school week in fall 2022.

References

External links
Sulphur Bluff ISD

School districts in Hopkins County, Texas
School districts in Franklin County, Texas